Bianca Gomes de Lima (born 10 August 1990), known as Bianca Gomes or just Bianca, is a Brazilian footballer who plays as a forward for Santos.

Club career
Born in São Paulo, Bianca began her career in futsal, playing in the sport until the age of 26. In 2017, she moved to football and started playing at Audax, and also represented  later in the year.

In March 2018, Bianca moved abroad and joined Chinese Women's Football Championship side Guangdong Meizhou Huijun. She returned to her home country in the following year, signing for Palmeiras.

On 11 January 2021, Bianca was announced at Corinthians. She left the club on 21 December 2022, and moved to Santos the following 9 January.

Honours
Palmeiras
: 2019

Corinthians
Campeonato Brasileiro de Futebol Feminino Série A1: 2021, 2022
Campeonato Paulista de Futebol Feminino: 2021
Copa Libertadores Femenina: 2021
Supercopa do Brasil de Futebol Feminino: 2022
: 2022

References

1990 births
Living people
Footballers from São Paulo
Brazilian footballers
Brazilian women's footballers
Women's association football forwards
Campeonato Brasileiro de Futebol Feminino Série A1 players
Sociedade Esportiva Palmeiras (women) players
Sport Club Corinthians Paulista (women) players
Santos FC (women) players